Bryant's Heath, Felmingham is a  biological Site of Special Scientific Interest west of North Walsham in Norfolk.

Most of this site is dry acidic heath on glacial sands, but there are also areas of wet heath, fen and carr woodland. Several unusual mosses and lichens have been recorded in wetter areas.

A public footpath between Felmingham and North Walsham goes through the heath.

References

Sites of Special Scientific Interest in Norfolk